The Making of a Man is a 1911 American short silent drama film produced by the Biograph Company of New York, directed by D. W. Griffith, and starring Dell Henderson and Blanche Sweet.

Cast
 Dell Henderson as Leading Man
 Blanche Sweet as Young Woman
 Edwin August as Young Woman's Family (unconfirmed)
 William J. Butler as Young Woman's Family
 Donald Crisp as Actor / Backstage
 Claire McDowell as Actress
 Mabel Normand as In Second Audience
 Gladys Egan (role unspecified)

See also
 D. W. Griffith filmography
 Blanche Sweet filmography

References

External links

1911 films
Silent American drama films
1911 short films
American silent short films
Biograph Company films
American black-and-white films
1911 drama films
Films directed by D. W. Griffith
1910s American films
1910s English-language films
English-language drama films
American drama short films